Baphia kirkii is a species of plant in the family Fabaceae. It is found in Mozambique, Tanzania, and possibly Kenya. It is threatened by habitat loss.

References

kirkii
Flora of Mozambique
Flora of Tanzania
Vulnerable plants
Taxonomy articles created by Polbot
Taxa named by John Gilbert Baker